Christopher Pitt (also known as Chris Pitt) (born 12 May 1965) is an Australian Paralympic shooter. He has represented Australia in the 2016 Rio Paralympics and the 2020 Summer Paralympics.

Personal
Pitt was born on 12 May 1965. At the age of ten, a virus led to him contracting degenerative muscle disease called dermatomyositis and by the age of twelve he was a wheelchair user. He grew up on a farm in Bundaberg, Queensland and as of 2021 still lives there and cares for his mother.

Shooting
Pitt took up shooting sport in 2010 and is classified as a SH1 shooter. He always had an interest in shooting due to life on the farm. His first international competition was the World Cup held in  Szczecin  Poland in April 2013 where he finished 13th. He won two gold medals at the 2013 Oceania World Championships in Sydney.

At the 2014 IPC World Championships in Hanover, Germany, he finished 11th in the 25m Pistol SH1 and 44th in the 10m Air Pistol SH1.  Throughout 2015 Chris continued to perform consistently well with three top-10 results at World Cups.

Pitt has stated that he has been inspired by Rheed McCracken, a Bundaberg wheelchair racer.

Pitt competed in the  2016 Rio Paralympics in the Men's 10 metre air pistol SH1 event where he placed 14th, as well as competing in the Mixed 25 metre pistol SH1, where he placed 7th.

At the 2018 World Shooting Para Sport Championships in Cheongju, South Korea, he finished 42nd in Men's 10m Air Pistol SH1 and 17th in the Mixed 25m Pistol SH1.

At the 2020 Summer Paralympics, he finished 25th in the Men's 10m Air Pistol SH1 and 30th in the Mixed 25m Pistol SH1.

References

External links

Living people
1965 births
Paralympic shooters of Australia
Shooters at the 2016 Summer Paralympics
Shooters at the 2020 Summer Paralympics
Wheelchair category Paralympic competitors
Sportspeople from Bundaberg